Olu Malau Islands ( Three Sisters Islands) are islands of Makira-Ulawa Province of Solomon Islands. The estimated terrain elevation above sea level is 24 metres.

Literally, the name Olu Malau means "Three Islands" (olu "three", malau "island").

The islands, from north to south, are:
Ali'ite
Malaulalo
Malaupaina

References

Islands of the Solomon Islands
Makira-Ulawa Province